Stefan Berger (born 1964) is the Director of the Institute for Social Movements, Ruhr University Bochum, Germany, and Chairman of the committee of the Library of the Ruhr Foundation. He is Professor of Social History at the Ruhr University. He specializes in nationalism and national identity studies, historiography and historical theory, comparative labour studies, and the history of industrial heritage.

Biography 
From 1985 to 1987 Berger attended the University of Cologne, where he studied history, political science and German literature. In 1990 he graduated with a PhD from the University of Oxford, with a thesis on The Labour Party and the SPD. A Comparison of their Structure and Development and a Discussion of the Relations Between the Two Movements, 1900–1933. He was a lecturer in Modern European History at the University of Plymouth in 1990/91, and from 1991 to 2000 he lectured in the same field at the School of European Studies, University of Wales, Cardiff. Until 2011 he was Professor of Modern German and Comparative European History at the University of Manchester, UK 

A significant part of Berger's research and works is on the nationalization of history. Berger was instrumental in the programme 'Representations of the Past: The Writing of National Histories in Nineteenth and Twentieth Century Europe (NHIST)' that the European Science Foundation organized between 2003 and 2008.

Selected works
1994: 
1997: 
1999: 
2004: 
2005: 
2007: 
 
2008: 
2010: 
2010:

References

External links 
 Homepage of ESF Scientific Programme "Representations of the Past: The Writing of National Histories in Europe (NHIST)"
 Homepage of Stefan Berger at the Institute for Social Movements, RUB

Scholars of nationalism
20th-century German historians
Academic staff of Ruhr University Bochum
Living people
Date of birth missing (living people)
1964 births
German male non-fiction writers
21st-century German historians